Complete Singles Box is a box set by Japanese entertainer Miho Nakayama. Released through King Records on March 1, 2006, to commemorate Nakayama's 20th anniversary, the box set compiles all of Nakayama's singles, B-sides, and remix albums. Also included is a DVD containing highlights from her Pure White Live '94 concert.

The box set peaked at No. 147 on Oricon's albums chart.

Track listing

Charts

References

External links
 
 

2006 compilation albums
Miho Nakayama compilation albums
Japanese-language compilation albums
King Records (Japan) compilation albums